Arthur William Loone (28 April 1857 – 15 June 1936) was an Australian politician. He was born in Bath in England. In 1910 he was elected to the Tasmanian Legislative Council as the Independent member for South Esk. He resigned in 1919 to contest the Senate, unsuccessfully; he was subsequently re-elected unopposed in the by-election to fill his Legislative Council vacancy. He was defeated later in 1920. Loone died in Scottsdale.

References

1857 births
1936 deaths
Independent members of the Parliament of Tasmania
Members of the Tasmanian Legislative Council
People from Bath, Somerset
English emigrants to Australia